Horrie is a masculine given name, typically used in Australia as a hypocorism (pet name) for Horace, as well as a surname. It may refer to:

Given name
Horrie the Wog Dog (1941–?), terrier and unofficial mascot of Australia's 2/1st Machine Gun Battalion
Horrie Bannister (1900–1978), Australian rules footballer
Horrie Bant (1882–1957), Australian rules footballer
Horrie Brain (1885–1966), Australian rules footballer
Horrie Bullen (1906–1961), Australian rules footballer
Horrie Clover (1895–1984), Australian rules footballer
Horrie Dargie (1917–1999), Australian musician
Horrie Davis (1889–1960), Australian cricketer
Horrie Dawson (1910–1982), Australian rules footballer
Horrie Dick (1877–1930), Australian rules footballer
Horrie Drane (1881–1965), Australian rules footballer
Horrie Edmonds (1908–1975), Australian rules footballer
Horrie Farmer, multiple people
Horrie Garrick (1918–1982), Australian politician
Horrie Gorringe (1895–1994), Australian rules footballer
Kevin "Horrie" Hastings (born 1957), Australian rugby league player
Horrie Jenkin (1893–1985), Australian rules footballer
Horrie Jones (1888–1967), Australian rules footballer
Horrie Jose (1893–1966), Australian rules footballer
Horrie Kessey (1927–2015), Australian rugby league player
Horrie Knight (1915–1990), Australian businessman and philanthropist
Horrie Lyons (1876–1921), Australian rules footballer
Horrie Mason (1903–1975), Australian rules footballer
Horrie Miller, multiple people
Horrie Pearce (1886–1936), Australian rules footballer
Horrie Pope (1887–1949), Australian rules footballer
Horrie Quinton (1878–1912), Australian rules footballer
Horrie Rice  (1872–1950), Australian tennis player
Horrie Riley (1902–1970), Australian rules footballer
Horrie Seden (born 1946), Australian darts player
Horrie Stanway (1908–1994), Australian rules footballer
Horrie Stevens (1912–1940), Australian rules footballer
Horrie Stewart (1871–1951), Australian rules footballer
Horrie Toole (born 1931), Australian rugby league player
Horrie Trinder (1875–1956), Australian rules footballer
Horrie Watt (1891–1969), Australian rugby league player
Horrie Webster (1888–1949), Australian rules footballer
Horrie Weeks (1895–1962), Australian rules footballer
Horrie White (1892–1959), Australian rules footballer

Surname
Chris Horrie, British journalist
Erik Horrie (born 1979), Australian adaptive rower and wheelchair basketball player

Other uses
Horrie the Wog Dog, 1945 book by Ion Idriess and Jim Moody
Horizontal Falls, nicknamed the "Horries", a natural phenomenon on the coast of the Kimberley in Western Australia

See also
Horace (given name)
Horry

English-language masculine given names
Hypocorisms